Kamienka is a village and municipality in Humenné District in the Prešov Region of north-east Slovakia.

History
In historical records the village was first mentioned in 1451.

Geography
The municipality lies at an altitude of 228 metres and covers an area of 5.385 km².
It has a population of about 565 people.

Genealogical resources

The records for genealogical research are available at the state archive "Statny Archiv in Presov, Slovakia"

 Roman Catholic church records (births/marriages/deaths): 1802-1954 (parish B)

See also
 List of municipalities and towns in Slovakia

References

External links
 * 
Surnames of living people in Kamienka

Villages and municipalities in Humenné District
Zemplín (region)